Wavertree is a Liverpool City Council Ward within the Liverpool Wavertree Parliamentary constituency. It was formed in 2004 taking in parts of the former Picton, Childwall and Church wards.

Councillors
The ward has three Councillors

 indicates seat up for re-election after boundary changes.

 indicates seat up for re-election.

 indicates change in affiliation.

 indicates seat up for re-election after casual vacancy.

Warren Bradley was suspended and eventually expelled from the Liberal Democrats following allegations of electoral fraud which he later admitted in Court, he contested the 2012 elections as an Independent.

In May 2013, Liberal Democrat Rosie Jolly, who faced re-election in 2014, defected to the Labour Party. She was re-elected.

In June 2013, Jake Morrison resigned his membership of the Labour Party, due partly to internal disputes with the local Labour MP and partly over disillusionment with national Labour policies.

In April 2017, Helen Casstles stood down citing conflicting work commitments.

Election results
Bold - Denotes the winning candidate.

Elections of the 2010s

Elections of the 2000s 

After the boundary change of 2004 the whole of Liverpool City Council faced election. Three Councillors were returned.

See also
 Liverpool City Council
 Liverpool City Council elections 1880–present
 Liverpool Town Council elections 1835 - 1879

References

External links
Ward Profile - Wavertree

Wards of Liverpool